Monterey Trail High School (MTHS or MT) is a 9th-12th grade college preparatory high school located in Elk Grove, California. The school was established in 2004 as part of the Elk Grove Unified School District.

History 
The school color of forest green is based on the abundant amount of trees along the areas of Elk Grove, Laguna Creek, and Franklin.  The second school color of gold is based on the Monterey Trail becoming well-traveled after the discovery of gold.  The school mascot, the Mustang, is based on the horses that travelers rode while traveling the Monterey Trail in the 19th century.

Mark Macres Memorial Stadium 

After Vice Principal Mark Macres died from cancer in the spring of 2007, the campus football stadium was dedicated to his name on October 26, 2007. As he was a vice principal at Florin High School before Monterey Trail High School, students and staff from both Monterey Trail High School and Florin High School as well as EGUSD dignitaries were invited to the dedication ceremony.

Monterey Trail High School has received full WASC accreditation.  As of 2018–2019, the graduation rate of Monterey Trail High School is 84.5% of students.

Monterey Trail High School's student news publication, Voices from the Trail, can be found at voicesfromthetrail.com.

Academics 
As of 2007–2008, Monterey Trail High School scored a 719 (out of 1000) on the Academic Performance Index (API), ranking fifth in the state and eighth in similar schools. The school also meets the Adequate Yearly Progress (AYP) requirements mandated by the No Child Left Behind Act. It uses block schedules for its academic scheduling.

 Monterey Trail High School has a Design and Technology Academy (DATA), designed to provide students with career technical skills in the areas of Engineering, Computer Science, and Environmental Architecture. DATA is a California Partnership Academy.

 The school also offers a Regional Occupation Program (ROP) in Virtual Enterprise, which provides skills to seek lifelong employment.

Monterey Trail High School has received full WASC accreditation. As of 2007–2008, the graduation rate of Monterey Trail High School is 95.3% of students.

Design and Technology Academy (DATA) 
The Design and Technology Academy (DATA) of Monterey Trail High School is an acclaimed technology program founded in 2004. The program offers three strands: Computer Science, Engineering, and Environmental Architecture. Currently students are enrolled in the program. DATA students enjoy the benefit of a close learning community that integrates teachers and students together.

Controversies and incidents  

 Two teenage boys were shot next to the school on Sep 30, 2016, closing school for a short period of time. The 300+ students left in the two nearby schools were put on lockdown.

 On Oct 31, 2018 the school had reports of a sexual assault outside of campus.

Notable alumni
 Saweetie - rapper and songwriter
 P. J. Johnson - NFL player

References

External links
 
 Elk Grove Unified School District Website
 Monterey Trail High School Key Club Website
  Monterey Trail High School Asian Club Website
 Velleity Literary Art Magazine Website
 Monterey Trail High School's Official Student Newspaper

High schools in Sacramento County, California
Public high schools in California
Elk Grove, California
2004 establishments in California